Moormerland is a municipality in the Leer District, in Lower Saxony, northwestern Germany.

References

Towns and villages in East Frisia
Leer (district)